The Defense Acquisition Program Administration (DAPA) was founded on January 1, 2006 as part of a comprehensive reform of the defense acquisition project, including the introduction and development of weapons, and is a central administrative agency of the South Korean Ministry of National Defense.

DAPA’s founding background
In South Korea, the acquisition and procurement of military weapons was an important area that required a huge budget and determined national security. South Korea has also made several improvements in the Ministry of National Defense to reform its defense acquisition project in the process of strengthening its defense capabilities. Based on the evaluation results of the Yulgok project, which was a plan to reinforce and modernize the South Korean military, the Ministry of National Defense established an acquisition office in January 1999 by integrating the work related to the introduction of weapons into one department.

However, as corruption scandals related to the introduction and development of weapons continued, efforts to improve the arms procurement system resumed after the inauguration of President Roh Moo-hyun's government. In late December 2003 and late January of the following year, President Roh Moo-hyun ordered improvements to the defense acquisition project, and in early March 2004, the Prime Minister's Office established the Defense Acquisition System Improvement Committee. After that, in early August 2005, a preparatory committee was established to improve the defense acquisition system and found the Defense Acquisition Program Administration, and on January 1, 2006, the Defense Acquisition Program Administration was founded after reorganization, enactment, and manpower securing.

Ministers

Defense Acquisition Program Promotion Committee 

In order to deliberate upon and coordinate major policies, management of financial resources and other purposes for the promotion of defense acquisition programs, the Defense Acquisition Program Promotion Committee was placed under the control of the Minister of National Defense. Through the Committee, with the minister of National Defense as chairman, project promotion methods and model decisions are discussed and adjusted and defense capacity improvement projects are implemented.

Major Procurement Projects 
DAPA manages a variety of defense procurement projects. Examples of current and past projects include:

Infantry weapon
 K1 selective-fire assault rifle
 K2 assault rifle
 K3 light machine gun
 K4 automatic grenade launcher
 K5 pistol
 K6 heavy machine gun
 K7 silenced submachine gun
 K12 general-purpose machine gun
 K14 sniper rifle
 K15 light machine gun
 K16 general-purpose machine gun

Missile systems
 Hycore hypersonic cruise missile (HCM) system
 Bigung (Poniard) 2.75-inch in diameter guided rocket system
 K136 Kooryong 36 extended multiple rocket launcher system
 Biryong (Flying Dragon) short range ship-to-ship guided weapon system based on K136
 K239 Chunmoo multiple launch rocket system (MLRS)
 Hyungung (AT-1K Raybolt) medium range infantry missile system
 Cheongeom (Taipers) air-to-ground guided missile system
 Hongsangeo (Red Shark) anti-submarine rocket system
 Haeseong-I (Sea Star) ROK Navy's main anti-ship cruise missile system
 Haeseong-II (SSM-710K) enhanced cruise missile system
 Haeseong-III (SSM-750K) enhanced cruise missile system
 Haeryong (Sea Dragon) tactical ship-launched land attack missile based on the Haeseong I
 KTSSM short-range tactical surface-to-surface ballistic missile system
 Hyunmoo ballistic missile system

Missile defense systems
 Cheongung-I (KM-SAM) medium-range surface-to-air guided weapon system based on technology from the 9M96 missile used on S-350E and S-400 missile systems
Cheongung-II enhanced medium-range surface-to-air guided weapon system
 Haegung (K-SAAM) surface-to-air anti missile system
 Cheonma (Pegasus) short-range surface-to-air missile system
 Shingung (KP-SAM) shoulder-launched surface-to-air missile
 L-SAM multi-layered missile defense system

Ground weapon systems
 KH178 105 mm towed howitzer
 KH179 155 mm towed howitzer
 K105A1 (EVO-105) 105 mm wheeled self-propelled artillery
 K9 Thunder 155 mm self-propelled howitzer
 K2 Black Panther main battle tank
 K131 light utility vehicle
 K151 military light utility vehicle
 K311 logistics and utility vehicle
 K511 logistics and utility vehicle
 K711 logistics and utility vehicle
 K200 infantry fighting vehicle
 K21 infantry fighting vehicle
 K21-105 light tank
 AS21 (Redback) infantry fighting vehicle
 KW1 Scorpion (White Tiger) wheeled armoured personnel carrier
 Biho (K30) twin 30 mm self-propelled anti-aircraft guns
 Cheonho (KA2) twin 30 mm wheeled self-propelled anti-aircraft guns
 Barracuda 4x4 armored wheeled vehicle
 Tigon 6x6 armored wheeled vehicle
 Korean Amphibious Assault Vehicle-II (KAAV-2)
 Unmanned Serveillance Vehicle
 K-NBC reconnaissance vehicle
 High energy laser

Maritime and underwater weapon systems
 Harbor Underwater Surveillance System (HUSS)
 Towed Array Sonar System (TASS)
 Torpedo Acoustic Counter Measure (TACM)
 FFG sonar system
 KDX-III batch-II integrated sonar system
 Jangbogo-III class (KSS-III) batch-I combat system
 Jangbogo-III class (KSS-III) batch-I sonar system
 Landing Platform Helicopter (LPH) combat system
 Patrol Killer Guided (PKG) missile-class combat system
 Ulsan-Class (FF) batch-I combat system
 Ulsan-Class (FF) batch-III combat system
 Dolgorae (Dolphin) midget submarine
 Multi-Mission Unmanned Surface Vehicle (MMUSV)
 Cheongsangeo (Blue Shark) light anti-submarine torpedo
 Baeksangeo (White Shark) heavy anti-submarine torpedo
 Beomsangeo (Tiger Shark) heavy anti-submarine torpedo

Aircraft and UAV systems
 KAI KF-21 Boramae 4.5 generation fighter aircraft
 KAI T-50 Golden Eagle family of supersonic advanced trainers and multirole light fighters, including the following variants:
 T-50 (advanced trainer version)
 TA-50 (lead-in fighter trainer and light attack version)
 FA-50 (multirole fighter all-weather version)
 T-50B (aerobatic specialized T-50 version for the ROKAF's aerobatic display team, the Black Eagles)
 KUH-1 (Surion) medium transport helicopter
 KT-1 (Woongbi) basic training aircraft
 KA-1 tactical control aircraft
 KGGB (Korean Guided GPS Bomb) precision guided glide bomb
 RQ-101 (Songgolmae) corps level reconnaissance UAV
 Corps level reconnaissance UAV-II
 KUS-FS MUAV
 Light Armed Helicopter (LAH)
 Blackout bomb air-to-ground weapon system

Surveillance and reconnaissance systems
 Radar for land systems
 KF-21 Active electronically scanned array (AESA) Radar
 Ulsan-Class (FF) batch-I AESA Radar
 Synthetic Aperture Radar (SAR) for KUS-FS
 Korean Commander's Panoramic Sight (KCPS) for K1A1
 Korean Gunner's Primary Sight (KGPS) for K2 Black Panther
 Sight system for K21 infantry fighting vehicle
 Thermal Observation Device (TOD)
 Electro-Optical Tracking System (EOTS) for PKG combat system
 Infrared Search and Track (IRST) for shipborne systems
 Forward-looking infrared (FLIR) system for KUH-1
 Tactical Electro-Optical and Infrared reconnaissance system (Tac-EO/IR)
 Electro-Optical and Infrared system for KUS-FS MUAV
 Electro-Optical and Infrared system for corps level reconnaissance UAV-II
 Infrared camera for satellites
 Multi-sensor and multi-source imagery fusion system

Command and control and information warfare systems
 Tactical Information Communications Network (TICN)
 Joint Tactical Data Link System (JTDLS)
 Air Defense Command Control and Alert (ADC2A) system
 Airborne ELINT pod system
 Tactical communication Electronic Warfare (EW) system-II (TLQ-200K)
 Airborne Electronic Countermeasure (ECM) pod system (ALQ-200)
 Shipboard electronic warfare system (SLQ-200K)
 Advanced SIGINT aircraft system

Space technologies
 Reconnaissance space-based surveillance and reconnaissance system
 Small satellite system
 Military satellite communication system-I
 Military satellite communication system-II

Core technologies
 Seeker
 Laser Detection and Ranging (LADAR)
 Optical Phased Array-Based LADAR
 Navigation technology
 Micromachined inertial sensors
 Fibre-Optic Gyroscope (FOG)
 Hemispherical Resonator Gyroscope (HRG)
 Control Moment Gyroscope (CMG)
 Star tracker
 Terrain referenced navigation
 Ground-Based Radio System (GRNS)
 Anti-jamming technology
 Global Navigation Satellite System (GNSS) Jamming
 Rocket propulsion
 Ramjet propulsion
 Engine Technology (subsonic gas Turbine and high speed) for missiles and UAV
 Defense materials
 Fuel cells and special batteries
 underwater acoustic sensor
 Hyperspectral image equipment
 EMP (Electromagnetic Pulse) technology
 Directional Infrared Countermeasure (DIRCM)
 High Energy Material (HEM)
 Ballistic protection technology
 Precision-guided munition
 Railgun
 Dual barrel air-burst technology for XK13 25 mm OCSW, Cancelled in 2013.
 Warrior platform
 AI-based autonomy technology
 Autonomus tunnel exploration robot
 Rescue robot
 Tailless demonstrator UAV for KUS-FC unmanned combat aerial vehicle
 Unmanned Combat Compound Rotorcraft (UCCR)
 Anti-Submarine Warfare Unmanned Underwater Vehicle (ASWUUV)
 Supercavitating torpedo
 Cyber security technologies
 Verification of chemical warfare agents
 Detoxification technology

Future technologies
 Artificial intelligence
 Blockchain
 Internet of Military Things (IoMT)
 Quantum technology
 Photonic radar technology
 Atomic technology
 Terahertz technology
 Perovskite solar cell
 Self-generated electrostatic energy
 Synthetic biology
 Meta-material for stealth technology
 Biomimetic robot
 Swarming unmanned system technology
 Boost phase interceptor
 Counter long-range artillery interceptor system
 Intelligent self-learning-based autonomous jamming
 Centralized sequential kill-chain

Other
 S&T Daewoo K11 DAW assault rifle

See also 
 Agency for Defense Development (ADD)

References

External links 

 

Military industry in South Korea
Military acquisition
Government agencies established in 2006
2006 establishments in South Korea
Ministry of National Defense (South Korea)